Dawnbreaker

The Dawn-Breakers, historical account of the early Bábí and Bahá'í faiths by Nabíl-i-A`zam in 1887–88
Dawn Breakers International Film Festival, international traveling film festival
Dawnbreaker Studios, San Fernando, California, studio for Destiny (The Jacksons album) and many other albums
"Dawnbreaker", 2018 song by Tiësto from I Like It Loud (EP)